Henrique Sereno Fonseca (born 18 May 1985), known as Sereno, is a Portuguese former professional footballer who played as a central defender.

Club career

Guimarães
Born in Elvas, Alto Alentejo, Sereno joined Vitória de Guimarães for 2005–06 from hometown's O Elvas CAD, and served a loan stint during the latter part of that season at lowly F.C. Famalicão.

In the 2007–08 campaign he, alongside Brazilian Pedro Geromel, formed a solid defensive partnership as Vitória came from the second division into a final third Primeira Liga position. On 9 March 2008 he scored a rare goal, in a 2–0 home win against Sporting CP.

Sereno spent the vast majority of 2008–09 in the sidelines after having undergone surgery to both knees, only appearing in six games. After beginning the following season again in the starting XI (nine matches, one goal), he eventually terminated his contract and, on 1 February 2010, signed with Real Valladolid in Spain for five months.

Sereno made his debut for his new team on 20 March 2010, playing the entire 2–0 away victory over Deportivo de La Coruña.

Porto
In late June 2010, after Valladolid's relegation in La Liga, Sereno returned to his country, signing with FC Porto on a free transfer. On 20 August 2011, deemed surplus to requirements as practically all Portuguese players, he joined German club 1. FC Köln on a season-long loan deal.

Sereno made his Bundesliga debut on 27 August 2011, playing the full 90 minutes in a 4–3 away defeat of Hamburger SV. He featured regularly during the campaign, but his team suffered relegation.

Sereno returned to Valladolid and Spain's top flight for 2012–13, still under contract with Porto. He scored his only goal for the former on 24 February 2013, in the 2–1 away win against Rayo Vallecano.

Later years
In summer 2013, Sereno joined Kayserispor from Turkey. He made his Süper Lig debut on 15 September, featuring the full 90 minutes in a 1–1 draw at Gençlerbirliği SK. He ended the season with 22 matches and three goals, in an eventual relegation as last.

On 27 July 2015, free agent Sereno returned to Germany by penning a two-year deal with 1. FSV Mainz 05. The following 15 June, however, after no competitive appearances, he was released.

Sereno scored his first goal for his next club, Atlético Kolkata, on 18 December 2016. It proved to be the equaliser as they went on to win the final of the Indian Super League on penalties, against Kerala Blasters FC.

On 31 January 2017, Sereno signed a six-month contract with Segunda División side UD Almería. On 15 September he returned to the Indian top tier, joining Chennaiyin FC for free and going on to act as captain for the eventual champions.

Two years after announcing his retirement at the age of 34, Sereno became president of U.D. Vilafranquense, with the Portuguese second-tier club overcome by severe financial problems.

International career
Sereno made his debut for Portugal on 10 June 2013, playing the second half of a 1–0 friendly win against Croatia in Geneva.

Personal life
On 24 June 2016, the Elvas city hall commended Sereno for his sporting achievements.

Career statistics

Club

International

Honours
Porto
Primeira Liga: 2010–11
Taça de Portugal: 2010–11
Supertaça Cândido de Oliveira: 2010, 2011

Kayserispor
TFF First League: 2014–15

Atlético Kolkata
Indian Super League: 2016

Chennaiyin
Indian Super League: 2017–18

References

External links

1985 births
Living people
People from Elvas
Sportspeople from Portalegre District
Portuguese footballers
Association football defenders
Primeira Liga players
Liga Portugal 2 players
Segunda Divisão players
O Elvas C.A.D. players
Vitória S.C. players
F.C. Famalicão players
FC Porto players
La Liga players
Segunda División players
Real Valladolid players
UD Almería players
Bundesliga players
1. FC Köln players
1. FSV Mainz 05 players
Süper Lig players
TFF First League players
Kayserispor footballers
Indian Super League players
ATK (football club) players
Chennaiyin FC players
Portugal under-21 international footballers
Portugal B international footballers
Portugal international footballers
Portuguese expatriate footballers
Expatriate footballers in Spain
Expatriate footballers in Germany
Expatriate footballers in Turkey
Expatriate footballers in India
Portuguese expatriate sportspeople in Spain
Portuguese expatriate sportspeople in Germany
Portuguese expatriate sportspeople in Turkey
Portuguese expatriate sportspeople in India